George Leslie Horine (February 3, 1890 – November 28, 1948) was an American athlete who mainly competed in the high jump. He is credited with developing a technique called a forerunner to the western roll, a technique he developed due to the layout of his backyard where he practiced which was considered "backward" at the time. While on the track team at Stanford University, his technique was corrected to the more conventional jumping style of the time. He equalled the NCAA record in the event at 6' 4" as a sophomore. His junior year, 1912, he reverted to his old style, improving to 6' 4 3/4" and then a world record 6' 6 1/8". A few weeks later at the Olympic Trials, he improved again to jump 6' 7" making him the first man to break the  barrier. It was the first high jump world record ratified by the IAAF. He never improved upon his record, which stood for two years.

Biography

Horine was born in Escondido, California on February 3, 1890.

He competed for the United States at the 1912 Summer Olympics held in Stockholm, Sweden where he won the bronze medal in  men's high jump event. He also competed for the USA in an exhibition baseball tournament in Stockholm.

He died at his home in Merced, California on November 28, 1948.

See also
 History of high jump
 Men's high jump world record progression

References

1890 births
1948 deaths
American male high jumpers
Olympic bronze medalists for the United States in track and field
Athletes (track and field) at the 1912 Summer Olympics
Baseball players at the 1912 Summer Olympics
Olympic baseball players of the United States
World record setters in athletics (track and field)
Sportspeople from Escondido, California
Medalists at the 1912 Summer Olympics